Calcium silicide may refer to 
Calcium monosilicide, CaSi
Calcium disilicide, CaSi2